Klebanov is a surname. Notable people with the surname include: 

Anatoly Klebanov (1952–2011), Soviet water polo player
Dmitri Klebanov (1907–1987), Ukrainian Soviet composer
Eugene Klebanov (born 1954), Russian rugby player and coach
Igor Klebanov (born 1962), American physicist
Ilya Klebanov (born 1951), Russian politician
Sam Klebanov (born 1965), Russian/Swedish film distributor and producer